Auressio is a village and former municipality in the canton of Ticino, Switzerland.

In 2001 the municipality was merged with the other, neighboring municipalities Berzona and Loco to form a new and larger municipality Isorno.

History

Auressio is first mentioned in 1233 as ''Oraxio'.

Until the 19th Century, the village had much closer ties to Piedmont than to the rest of the Onsernone valley.  The construction of the road through the valley in the 19th Century brought it closer to the rest of the valley.

The church of S. Antonio Abate was finished in 1526 and became the center of an independent parish in 1792 after it separated from Loco.

After World War II farming and grazing were almost abandoned and replaced by short-term, seasonal emigration.  The improved transport links to the nearby town of Locarno increased Auressio's attractiveness as a place to live for those that were employed in Locarno.  This led to a clear population increase in recent years.

One notable building in Auressio is the Villa Edera, which was built in 1887, for the Paris impresario Paolo Antonio Calzonio.  It was restored in the early 1990s by the municipality and is now used as a hostel.

Historic population
The historical population is given in the following table:

References

External links

Former municipalities of Ticino
Villages in Onsernone